Emmanuel Adetoyese Badejo is the Catholic Bishop of Oyo diocese. He was born on 13 of July 1961. He was ordained a priest by the bishop of the Roman Catholic Diocese of Oyo, Julius Babatunde Adelakun (now Emeritus) on 4 January 1986. He was appointed the Catholic Bishop of Oyo by Pope Benedict XVI after the retirement of Julius Babatunde Adelakun on 14 August 2007.

Early life 

Emmanuel Badejo was born into a Catholic family on 13 July 1961. After his secondary education in the Minor Seminary he studied philosophy at the Regional Major Seminary of Ss. Peter and Paul Ibadan Oyo state. After  completing his studies he received a Bachelor of Theology degree from the Pontifical Urban University in Rome Italy.

Church leader
Emmanuel Badejo was the President of the Association of Nigerian Priests and Religious in Rome (1993-1994)

He was appointed to work in the Department of Communication at the Catholic Secretariat of Nigeria in Lagos(1996-2003). During this period, he founded and was the First National Chaplain of the Catholic Artistes and Entertainers Association of Nigeria, (Film/Video) CAEAN from 2005-2006.

on August 14, 2007 Badejo was elected bishop of the Diocese of Oyo. He received his Episcopal ordination on 20 October 2007, becoming styled Most Reverend Dr Emmanuel Adetoyese Badejo.

He publicly assumed office on 20 November 2009 after the retirement of Julius Babatunde Adelakun

Appointment to the Vatican Dicastery

Pope Francis appointed Bishop Badejo a member of the Vatican Dicastery on Friday December 3rd 2021.  

The Dicastery of Communications is the administrative department of the Holy See through which the Pope directs affairs that pertain to Social Communications in the Roman Catholic Church.

References

External links

21st-century Roman Catholic bishops in Nigeria
Living people
1961 births
Roman Catholic bishops of Oyo